KLLA (1570 kHz AM) is West Central Louisiana's only AM radio station. It is licensed to Leesville, Louisiana.

External links

Oldies radio stations in the United States
Radio stations in Louisiana
Radio stations established in 1956
1956 establishments in Louisiana